Akre is a surname. Notable people with the surname include:

 Carrie Akre (born 1966), American singer
 Charles T. Akre (21st century), American investor
 Helge Akre (born 1903), Norwegian diplomat
 Jane Akre (21st century), American journalist
 Karl Akre (1840–1912), Norwegian politician